The Australia-India Comprehensive Economic Cooperation Agreement (AI-CECA) is a bilateral agreement between Australia and India. The two nations launched negotiations for a Comprehensive Economic Cooperation Agreement in May 2011. On 2 April 2022, an interim agreement was signed by Ministers Dan Tehan, representing the Morrison Government of Australia and Piyush Goyal, representing the Modi Government of India.

The agreement cuts tariffs on a range of Australian exports to India, including coal, lentils, sheep meat and wool, lobsters and rare earths. It also promised a phased reduction of tariffs on wine and other agricultural products including avocados, cherries, nuts, blueberries, almonds, oranges, mandarins, pears and strawberries. "We are opening the biggest door of one of the biggest economies in the world in India," Prime Minister Scott Morrison said ahead of the signing. Minister Tehan predicted the agreement would lead to a doubling of trade in coming years. "India and Australia are natural partners. Like two brothers, both nations supported each other during the COVID-19 pandemic. Our relationship rests on the pillars of trust and reliability", Minister Goyal said.

See also

Australia–India relations

References

External links
Australia-India Comprehensive Economic Cooperation Agreement (AI-CECA)

Free trade agreements of Australia
Free trade agreements of India
 
Bilateral relations of Australia
Australia